A protein skimmer or foam fractionator is a device used to remove organic compounds such as food and waste particles from water. It is most commonly used in commercial applications like municipal water treatment facilities and public aquariums. Smaller protein skimmers are also used for filtration of home saltwater aquariums.

Function
Protein skimming removes certain organic compounds, including proteins and amino acids found in food particles, by using the polarity of the protein itself. Due to their intrinsic charge, water-borne proteins are either repelled or attracted by the air/water interface and these molecules can be described as hydrophobic (such as fats or oils) or hydrophilic (such as salt, sugar, ammonia, most amino acids, and most inorganic compounds). However, some larger organic molecules can have both hydrophobic and hydrophilic portions. These molecules are called amphipathic or amphiphilic. Commercial protein skimmers work by generating a large air/water interface, specifically by injecting large numbers of bubbles into the water column. In general, the smaller the bubbles the more effective the protein skimming is because the surface area of small bubbles occupying the same volume is much greater than the same volume of larger bubbles. Large numbers of small bubbles present an enormous air/water interface for hydrophobic organic molecules and amphipathic  organic molecules to collect on the bubble surface (the air/water interface). Water movement hastens diffusion of organic molecules, which effectively brings more organic molecules to the air/water interface and lets the organic molecules accumulate on the surface of the air bubbles. This process continues until the interface is saturated, unless the bubble is removed from the water or it bursts, in which case the accumulated molecules release back into the water column. However, it is important to note that further exposure of a saturated air bubble to organic molecules may continue to result in changes as compounds that bind more strongly may replace those molecules with a weaker binding that have already accumulated on the interface. Although some aquarists believe that increasing the contact time (or dwell time as it is sometimes called) is always good, it is incorrect to claim that it is always better to increase the contact time between bubbles and the aquarium water. As the bubbles increase near the top of the protein skimmer water column, they become denser and the water begins to drain and create the foam that will carry the organic molecules to the skimmate collection cup or to a separate skimmate waste collector and the organic molecules, and any inorganic molecules that may have become bound to the organic molecules, will be exported from the water system.

In addition to the proteins removed by skimming, there are a number of other organic and inorganic molecules that are typically removed. These include a variety of fats, fatty acids, carbohydrates, metals such as copper, and trace elements such as iodine. Particulates, phytoplankton, bacteria, and detritus are also removed; this is desired by some aquarists, and is often enhanced by placement of the skimmer before other forms of filtration, lessening the burden on the filtration system as a whole. There is at least one published study that provides a detailed list of the export products removed by the skimmer. Aquarists who keep filter-feeding invertebrates, however, sometimes prefer to keep these particulates in the water to serve as natural food.

Protein skimmers are used to harvest algae and phytoplankton gently enough to maintain viability for culturing or commercial sale as live cultures.

Alternative forms of water filtration have recently come into use, including the algae scrubber, which leaves food particles in the water for corals and small fish to consume, but removes the noxious compounds including ammonia, nitrite, nitrate, and phosphate that protein skimmers do not remove.

Design

All skimmers have key features in common: water flows through a chamber and is brought into contact with a column of fine bubbles. The bubbles collect proteins and other substances and carry them to the top of the device where the foam, but not the water, collects in a cup. Here the foam condenses to a liquid, which can be easily removed from the system. The material that collects in the cup can range from pale greenish-yellow, watery liquid to a thick black tar.

Consider this summary of optimal protein skimmer design by Randy Holmes-Farley: 
For a skimmer to function maximally, the following things must take place:
1. A large amount of air/water interface must be generated.
2. Organic molecules must be allowed to collect at the air/water interface.
3. The bubbles forming this air/water interface must come together to form a foam.
4. The water in the foam must partially drain without the bubbles popping prematurely.
5. The drained foam must be separated from the bulk water and discarded.

Also under considerable recent attention has been the general shape of a skimmer as well.  In particular, much attention has been given to the introduction of cone shaped skimmer units.  Originally designed by Klaus Jensen in 2004, the concept was founded on the principle that a conical body allows the foam to accumulate more steadily through a gently sloping transition.  This reduces the overall turbulence, resulting in more efficient skimming.  While research into the specific benefits of the design are still being measured, early reviews of many conical skimmers have been positive overall. Cylindrical-shaped protein skimmers are also common.

Overall, protein skimmers can be classed in two ways depending on whether they operate by co-current flow or counter-current flow. In a co-current flow system, air is introduced at the bottom of the chamber and is in contact with the water as it rises upwards towards the collection chamber. In a counter-current system, air is forced into the system under pressure and moves against the flow of the water for a while before it rises up towards the collection cup. Because the air bubbles may be in contact with the water for a longer period in a counter-current flow system, protein skimmers of this type are considered by some to be more effective at removing organic wastes.

Co-current flow systems

Air stone
The original method of protein skimming, running pressurized air through a diffuser to produce large quantities of micro bubbles, remains a viable, effective, and economic choice, although newer technologies may require lower maintenance.  The air stone is most often an oblong, partially hollowed block of wood, most often of the genus Tilia. The most popular wooden air-stones for skimmers are made from limewood (Tilia europaea or European limewood) although basswood (Tilia americana or American Linden), works as well, may be cheaper and is often more readily available. The wooden blocks are drilled, tapped, fitted with an air fitting, and connected by air tubing to one or more air pumps delivering at least 1 cfm.  The wooden air stone is placed at the bottom of a tall column of water. The tank water is pumped into the column, allowed to pass by the rising bubbles, and back into the tank. To get enough contact time with the bubble, these units can be many feet in height.

Air stone protein skimmers may be constructed as a DIY project from pvc pipes and fittings at low cost    and with varying degrees of complexity .

While this method has been around for many years, many regard it as inefficient for larger systems or systems with large bio-loads.

Venturi
The premise behind these skimmers is that a venturi pump, or aspirator, can be used to introduce the bubbles into the water stream.  The tank water is pumped through the venturi, in which fine bubbles are introduced, then enters the skimmer body.  This method was popular due to its compact size and high efficiency but venturi designs are now more likely to be included in other skimmer designs rather than as a simple venturi design.

Counter-current flow systems

Aspirating: pin-wheel/adrian-wheel, needle-wheel, mesh-wheel

This basic concept is more correctly known as an aspirating skimmer, since some skimmer designs using an aspirator do not use a "Pin-Wheel"/"Adrian-Wheel" or "Needle-Wheel". "Pin-Wheel"/"Adrian-Wheel" describes the look of an impeller that consists of a disk with pins mounted perpendicular (90°) to the disc and parallel to the rotor. "Needle-Wheel" describes the look of an impeller that consists of a series of pins projecting out perpendicular to the rotor from a central axis.  "Mesh-Wheel" describes the look of an impeller that consists of a mesh material attached to a plate or central axis on the rotor. The purpose of these modified impellers is to chop or shred the air that is introduced via a venturi apparatus or external air pump into very fine bubbles. The Mesh-Wheel design is fairly new and, while providing excellent results in the short term because of its ability to draw in more air and create finer bubbles with its thin cutting surfaces, it is still being developed and will likely continue to evolve over a few more years.

This style of protein skimmer has become very popular and is believed to be the most popular type of skimmer used with residential reef aquariums today. It has been particularly successful in smaller aquariums due to its usually compact size, ease of set up and use, and quiet operation. Since the pump is pushing a mixture of air and water, the power required to turn the rotor can be decreased and may result in a lower power requirement for that pump vs. the same pump with a different impeller when it is only pumping water.

Downdraft

The Downdraft skimmer is both a proprietary skimmer design and a style of protein skimmer that injects water under high pressure into tubes that have a foam or bubble generating mechanism and carry the air/water mixture down into the skimmer and into a separate chamber. The proprietary design is protected in the United States with patents and commercial skimmer products in the US are limited to that single company. Their design uses one or more tubes with plastic media such as bio balls inside to mix water under high pressure and air in the body of the skimmer resulting in foam that collects protein waste in a collection cup. This was one of the earlier high performance protein skimmer designs and large models were produced that saw success in large and public aquariums.

Beckett skimmer
The Beckett skimmer has some similarities to the downdraft skimmer but introduced a foam nozzle to produce the flow of air bubbles. The name Beckett comes from the patented foam nozzle developed and sold by the Beckett Corporation (United States), although similar foam nozzle designs are sold by other companies outside the United States (e.g. Sicce (Italy)). Instead of using the plastic media that is found in downdraft skimmer designs, the Beckett skimmer uses design concepts from previous generations of skimmers, specifically the downdraft skimmer and the venturi skimmer (the Beckett 1408 Foam Nozzle is a modified 4 port venturi) to produce a hybrid that is capable of using powerful pressure rated water pumps and quickly processing large amounts of aquarium water in a short period of time. Commercial Beckett skimmers come in single Beckett, dual Beckett, and quad Beckett designs. Well engineered Beckett skimmers are quiet and reliable but the powerful pumps used in larger Beckett skimmer designs can take up additional space, introduce additional noise, and use more electricity than less powerful pumps. Unlike the Downdraft and Spray Induction skimmers, Beckett skimmer designs are produced by a number of companies in the United States and elsewhere and are not known to be restricted by patents.

Spray induction
This method is related to the downdraft, but uses a pump to power a spray nozzle, fixed a few inches above the water level. The spray action entraps and shreds the air in the base of the unit, which then rises to the collection chamber. In the United States, one company has patented the spray induction technology and the commercial product offerings are limited to that single company.

Recirculating skimmer designs
A recent trend is to change the method by which the skimmer is fed 'dirty' water from the aquarium as a means to recirculate water within the skimmer multiple times before it is returned to the sump or the aquarium. Aspirating pump skimmers are the most popular type of skimmer to use recirculating designs although other types of skimmers, such as Beckett skimmers, are also available in recirculating versions. While there is a popular belief among some aquarist that this recirculation increases the dwell or contact time of the generated air bubbles within the skimmer there is no authoritative evidence that this is true. Each time water is recirculated within the skimmer any air bubbles in that water sample are destroyed and new bubbles are generated by the recirculating pump venturi apparatus so the air-water contact time begins again for these newly created bubbles. In non-recirculating skimmer designs, a skimmer has one inlet supplied by a pump that pulls water in from the aquarium and injects it with air into the skimmer and releasing the foam or air/water mix into the reaction chamber. With a recirculating design, the one inlet is usually driven by a separate feed pump, or in some cases may be gravity fed, to receive the dirty water to process, while the pump providing the foam or air/water mix into the reaction chamber is set up separately in a closed loop on the side of the skimmer. The recirculating pump pulls water out of the skimmer and injects air to generate the foam or air/water mix before returning it to the skimmer reaction chamber—thus 'recirculating' it. The feed pump in a recirculating design typically injects a smaller amount of dirty water than co/counter-current designs. The separate feed pump allows easy control of the rate of water exchange through the skimmer and for many aquarists this is one of the important attractions of recirculating skimmer designs. Because the pump configuration of these skimmers is similar to that of aspirating pump skimmers, the power consumption advantages are also similar.

References

Further reading

Fishkeeping
Separation processes
Chemical equipment